"Did It Again" is a song by American rapper Lil Tecca. It was released on July 24, 2019, as the seventh single from his debut mixtape We Love You Tecca. The song debuted at number 100 and peaked at 64 on the Billboard Hot 100, making it his second entry after "Ransom" peaked at number 4.

Background 
The song was originally released as a single on January 21, 2019, before being re-released on July 24, 2019.

Chart performance 
Did It Again debuted at number 100 on the Billboard Hot 100, and eventually reached its peak at number 64. On September 17, 2020, the single was certified platinum by the Recording Industry Association of America (RIAA) for combined sales and streaming equivalent units of over a million units in the United States.

Music video 
The music video debuted on WorldStarHipHop on March 2, 2019. It has over 78 million views as of January 2022.

Charts

Certifications

References 

2019 singles
2019 songs
Lil Tecca songs
Song recordings produced by Taz Taylor (record producer)
Songs written by Lil Tecca
Songs written by Nick Mira
Songs written by Taz Taylor (record producer)